Tom Kimber-Smith (born 1 November 1984 in Ascot, Berkshire) is a British race car driver. He is currently driving the No. 52 PR1/Mathiasen Motorsports Oreca FLM09 in the WeatherTech SportsCar Championship PC class with Robert Alon.

He has enjoyed success in sportscars, winning both the Le Mans 24 Hours and Le Mans Series LMP2 class for Greaves Motorsport in 2011. He won the LMP2 class again in the  race, driving for Starworks Motorsport with Ryan Dalziel and Enzo Potolicchio in Starworks Motorsport's HPD ARX-03b. He won the 2015 24 hours of Daytona, 12 Hours of Sebring, and Petit Le Mans in the PC class, nearly sweeping the Tequila Patron North American Endurance Cup of the WeatherTech SportsCar Championship in 2015.

He is the son of Geoff Kimber-Smith, a former driver in the British Touring Car Championship.

Racing record

Career summary

Complete Formula 3 Euro Series results
(key)

24 Hours of Le Mans results

WeatherTech SportsCar Championship

Complete FIA World Endurance Championship results

References

External links
 
 

English racing drivers
British Formula Renault 2.0 drivers
Formula 3 Euro Series drivers
1984 births
Living people
Dutch Formula Renault 2.0 drivers
Formula Ford drivers
24 Hours of Le Mans drivers
British GT Championship drivers
European Le Mans Series drivers
American Le Mans Series drivers
FIA World Endurance Championship drivers
24 Hours of Daytona drivers
WeatherTech SportsCar Championship drivers
People from Ascot, Berkshire
Kolles Racing drivers
Greaves Motorsport drivers
Cheever Racing drivers
Starworks Motorsport drivers
Caterham Racing drivers